Tridens muticus is a species of grass known by the common name slim tridens. It is native to Mexico and the southwestern quadrant of the United States.

Distribution
It grows several types of habitat, including plateau and desert, woodlands, sagebrush, plains, and other areas with dry sandy and clay soils.

Description
It is a perennial grass forming a thick tuft with a knotted base and rhizome. It reaches a maximum height of 50 to 80 centimeters. The panicle has short branches appressed to the others, making the inflorescence narrow. The florets are generally purple in color.

This plant uses C4 carbon fixation as its method of energy metabolism.

References

External links
Jepson Manual Treatment
Grass Manual Treatment

Chloridoideae
Grasses of the United States
Native grasses of California
Grasses of Mexico
Flora of the California desert regions
Flora of the Southwestern United States
Flora of Northwestern Mexico